Charles Edge is an American computer scientist and author. Edge is a contributing author for Inc.com and Huffington Post.

Edge spent 15 years as the Chief Technology Officer of 318 Inc in Santa Monica and 5 years at Jamf Pro. He is now the Chief Technology Officer of Bootstrappers and HandrailUX. Edge has spoken at Defcon, Blackhat, LinuxWorld, MacSysAdmin, and a number of other conferences.

Bibliography (author) 

 Mac Tiger Little Black Book. Paraglyph Press, February 2006, 
 Web Scripting Little Black Book. Paraglyph Press, April 2007, 
 Foundations of Mac OS X Security. Apress, March 2008, 
 Enterprise Mac Administrators Guide. Apress, October 2009, 
 Foundations of Mac OS X Snow Leopard Security. Apress, February 2010, 
 Beginning Mac OS X Server. Apress, February 2010, 
 Mac OS X Lion Server. O'Reilley, January 2011, 
 Using Apple Configurator. Packt, January 2012, 
 Take Control of OS X Yosemite Server. TidBits, January 2013, 
 Take Control of OS X Mavericks Server. TidBits, January 2014, 
 Learning iOS Security. Packt, January 2015, 
 Enterprise Mac Administrators Guide.Apress, September 2015, 
 Fundamentals of Mac OS X 10.11 Security.Apress, September 2015, 
 Enterprise Mac Security. Apress, 
 Build, Run, and Sell Your Apple Consulting Practice. Apress, August 2018, 
 Apple Device Management. Apress, January 2020, 
The ABCs of Computers (2022)
The Startup Field Guide (2022)
The History of Computers (2023)

Podcasts 
Edge maintains the following podcasts:

 MacAdmins Podcast https://podcast.macadmins.org
 Jamf After Dark Podcast https://podcasts.apple.com/us/podcast/jamf-after-dark/id1434572611
 The History Of Computing http://thehistoryofcomputing.net

Community work 
Edge works on a number of open source projects including precache, swift-ldif-csv, and jssimporter and serves on the board of directors of Tamarisk and on the corporate council of the Guthrie Theater.

Edge spoke at Black Hat 2007 and was scheduled to give a speech on a vulnerability of the Mac OS X FileVault at Black Hat 2008 but the talk was pulled after he cited a non-disclosure agreement the talk would violate. The talk was later disputed having ever existed.

Edge wrote the SANS course on Mac OS X Security in 2007, establishing baseline security practices for Apple and IoT  devices in large-scale environments.

Edge founded the Minnesota non-profit Minnesota Computer History Museum in January 2020.

Editor 
Edge is on the Editorial team for the Apple Inc. platform, with Apress. Edge was also the technical editor for the following title(s):

 Mac OS X for Unix Geeks. O'Reilly, September 2008,

References 

Year of birth missing (living people)
Living people
American computer scientists